Rockhampton–Emu Park Road is a continuous  road route in the Rockhampton and Livingstone local government areas of Queensland, Australia. The route is designated as State Route 4 (Regional) and Tourist Drive 10. It is a state-controlled regional road (number 194).

Route description
It enters  and continues south-east for a short distance before turning north-east.

Land use along the road is mainly rural, but with business and residential developments at each end.

Road condition
The road is fully sealed, with almost no dual carriageway. The following projects aim to improve the condition of sections of this road.

Road train access to Rockhampton
The project for upgrading between  saleyards and the Rockhampton abattoirs to provide access for Type 1 Road Trains, funded by the Northern Australia Beef Roads Program, was completed by early 2021 at a total cost of $30 million.
 Capricorn Highway – from Saleyards Road at Gracemere to the Bruce Highway roundabout at Rochhampton.
 Bruce Highway – from the Capricorn Highway roundabout to the Yaamba Road intersection.
 Rockhampton–Yeppoon Road – from the Bruce Highway intersection south-west to the Emu Park Road intersection (.
 Rockhampton–Emu Park Road – from the Rockhampton–Yeppoon Road intersection to St Christophers Chapel Road at Nerimbera.

Overtaking lanes and safety improvements
A project to provide overtaking lanes and priority safety and capacity improvements, at a cost of $19 million, is planned for construction from late 2022 to mid-2024.

History

The Archer brothers established the Gracemere pastoral run in 1855, on land that included the present site of Rockhampton. They made use of the Fitzroy River for shipping supplies and produce, and built a woolshed on the river bank. They also played a role in coining the name "Rockhampton" for their riverside worksite. Permanent settlement at the town site began in 1856, and the town was proclaimed and surveyed in 1858. The region expanded quickly due to good available land and water. Land to the north of the river was opened for settlement in the late 1850s, and became the location of both large holdings and small farms.

A large pastoral run was established along the length of the Capricorn Coast in 1865, extending from the  area south towards what is now Emu Park.

European settlement in the Emu Park district began in the 1860s when John Jardine established a cattle grazing property to the south, at Zilzie. Emu Park township was established in the 1870s when several Rockhampton families built seaside holiday houses on the hills overlooking the two beaches that are a feature of the town. The first road to the district was established at this time, and small farms were set up along it. This road was the only access to the district until 1888, when the railway arrived.

The first bridge across the Fitzroy River was opened in 1881, replacing a steam ferry and increasing road usage to Emu Park.

Current usage
The first  from Berserker is used by road trains carrying cattle to the Rockhampton abattoirs. In conjunction with Rockhampton-Yeppoon Road and the Scenic Highway, it is a popular tourist drive.

Major intersections
All distances are from Google Maps.

See also

 List of road routes in Queensland
 List of numbered roads in Queensland
 List of tourist drives in Queensland

Notes

References

Roads in Queensland